Pay as You Exit is a 1936 Our Gang short comedy film directed by Gordon Douglas. It was the 148th Our Gang short that was released.

Plot
Hoping to attract customers to Spanky's barnyard production of Romeo and Juliet, star performer Alfalfa proposes a "pay as you exit" policy: If the kids like the show, they'll pay the allotted "one penny" admission on the way out.

Alas, the show is nearly over before it starts when leading lady Darla walks out, complaining that Alfalfa has been eating onions (which, he insists, improves his splendid speaking voice.) Spanky stalls for time in a cute weight-lifting act, but Porky stole the show. Alfalfa hits upon a replacement for Darla: Buckwheat, decked out in a lovely blonde wig and Juliet costume. When the kids in the audience recognize him, they clap and cheer and call out, "It's Buckwheat! Hooray for Buckwheat!"

However, the ladder Alfalfa is standing on gives way; Buckwheat saves him before he falls. When the ladder gives way again, Alfalfa tells Buckwheat to hold on tight, but the aroma of onions gets to Buckwheat, causing him to let go.  As the ladder weaves, Spanky drops the curtain and Alfalfa and the ladder then tear through it and into the audience, much to their laughing delight.

When the audience leaves, Spanky admonishes him for his "pay as you exit" scheme. But pay they did and Alfalfa and Spanky eat onions as a toast to their success.

Notes
Joe Cobb, an Our Gang star from the series' silent days, makes a return appearance.
Among the incidental music played on the Victrola by stagehand Porky in the course of the show are LeRoy Shield's familiar background tunes "In My Canoe" and "Hide and Go Seek", as well as "Walking the Deck", a tune written for the 1936 Laurel and Hardy feature Our Relations.
The Buckwheat character was originally a girl, but had morphed into a boy by this episode, appearing for the first time in his new costuming—overalls, striped shirt, oversized shoes, and a large unkempt Afro—which was retained for the series until the end.

Cast

The Gang
 Darla Hood as Darla
 Eugene Lee as Porky
 George McFarland as Spanky
 Carl Switzer as Alfalfa
 Billie Thomas as Buckwheat

Additional cast
 Joe Cobb as Leader of the audience kids

Audience extras
John Collum, Rex Downing, Jack Egger, Paul Hilton, Sidney Kibrick, Harold Switzer, Marvin Strin, Robert Winckler

See also
 Our Gang filmography

References

External links

1936 films
1936 comedy films
American black-and-white films
Films directed by Gordon Douglas
Hal Roach Studios short films
Our Gang films
1930s American films